Daniela Hantuchová and Anastasia Myskina were the defending champions, but Myskina withdrew before the tournament began due to a left big toe inflammation. Hantuchová teamed up with Shahar Pe'er, but lost in the first round.

Lisa Raymond and Samantha Stosur won the title, winning in straight sets against their rivals Cara Black and Rennae Stubbs in the final.

Seeds

Draw

References
 Draw
 2006 Stuttgart, Tokyo & Tashkent WTA Singles Results     N Petrova, M Bartoli, & T Sun, Champions

2006 Doubles
Porsche Tennis Grand Prix - Doubles